Rodolfo Torres may refer to:

 Rodolfo Torres (footballer) (born 1929), Mexican footballer
 Rodolfo Torres (cyclist) (born 1987), Colombian cyclist
 Rodolfo Torres (swimmer), a Honduran swimmer
 Rodolfo H. Torres, Argentine mathematician